Sarah Lawson may refer to:

Sarah Lawson (actress) (born 1928), British actress
Sarah Lawson (producer) (1955–2008), English film producer